Murray Mill may mean:
 Murrays' Mills in Manchester, England
 Murray's Mill or Murray Mill, another name for the E. Van Winkle Gin and Machine Works in Atlanta, Georgia, USA